Jacob Kennedy may refer to:

Jake Bugg, née Jacob Kennedy
Jacob Kennedy (rugby union), 2006 Air New Zealand Cup